Jimmy DeSana (November 12, 1949 – July 27, 1990) was an American artist, and a key figure in the East Village punk art and New Wave scene of the 1970s and 1980s. DeSana's photography has been described as "anti-art" in its approach to capturing images of the human body, in a manner ranging from "savagely explicit to purely symbolic". DeSana was close collaborators with photographer Laurie Simmons and writer William S. Burroughs, who wrote the introduction to DeSana's self-published collection of photographs Submission. His work includes the album cover for the Talking Heads album More Songs about Buildings and Food as well as John Giorno’s LP, You’re The Guy I Want To Share My Money With.

Early life and education 

James Arthur "Jimmy" DeSana was born in Detroit, Michigan, 12 NOV 1949 the son of James Arthur DeSana and his wife Josephine Earle Graves. He grew up in Atlanta, Georgia.

In 1972, DeSana moved to New York after studying at the University of Georgia.

Work 
DeSana began to take photographs being a teen, mostly photographing his friends and acquaintances naked. Portraits included key figures of the punk and New Wave scene of the late 1970s and early 1980s in New York like Kathy Acker, Laurie Simmons, Kenneth Anger, David Byrne, Brian Eno, Laurie Anderson, Debbie Harry, and Patti Astor, amongst others.

His early photographs were of his friends striking silly and sexy poses in houses and gardens. He moved to New York in 1973. DeSana continued to picture the human body as the primary subject. He worked in black and white till 1980, when he began to experiment with color photography. DeSana's Suburban series included neo-surreal, staged photographs of both nude bodies and mundane objects.

Remainders series marked a move away from the human body towards "objects through abstraction." Th series included everyday items like balloons, flour, and aluminum foil are dreamily lit in spectral hues. DeSana started making these works shortly after his diagnosis with HIV in 1985.

He had numerous solo exhibitions, including those in Wilkinson Gallery, London;  Pat Hearn Gallery, New York; Galerie Jacques de Windt, Brussels and Museum of the Twentieth Century, Vienna, Austria DeSana was featured in the 1981 P.S.1 exhibition New York/New Wave curated by Diego Cortez and included artists like Basquiat, Sarah Charlesworth, and Kenny Scharf.

DeSana died in 1990 from AIDS related illness. DeSana's first museum retrospective was at the Brooklyn Museum in 2022-2023.

Estate 
When DeSana died in 1990, he left his estate to the photographer and filmmaker Laurie Simmons. The estate was co-managed with Simmons and Salon 94 gallery for nearly a decade.

In 2022, it was announced that the estate would now be  co-managed with P.P.O.W. gallery.

Exhibitions 

In 2013, "Party Picks," a selection of DeSana’s photography from 1975 to 1987 was shown at Salon 94 gallery.

At Pioneer Works in 2016, a suite of photographers were shown from the artist's archives. Singer and writer Johanna Fateman wrote, "[DeSana] troubled suburban interiors with nude models in precarious poses, recasting everyday objects as BDSM props in his spare, elegant tableaux."

The following year, several Cibachrome photographs were shown in a group exhibition called “Body Language” at Company gallery.

In 2020, "The Sodomite Invasion: Experimentation, Politics and Sexuality in the work of Jimmy DeSana and Marlon T. Riggs" was shown at Griffin Arts Project in North Vancouver, British Columbia.

DeSana's first museum retrospective opened at the Brooklyn Museum in late 2022. The retrospective showcased the pioneering yet underrecognized artist's New York City downtown art, music and film scenes during the 1970s and 1980s. The show is curated by the art historian and curator Drew Sawyer alongside the artist Laurie Simmons.

Publications 

 101 Nudes, Offset prints in custom portfolio box, Fifty-six parts, each 11 x 14 inches, 1972/91
 Submission, Introduction by William Burroughs, 1979
 Jimmy DeSana: Suburban, Text by Laurie Simmons, Dan Nadel, and Elisabeth Sussman, 2015
 The Sodomite Invasion: Experimentation, Politics and Sexuality in the work of Jimmy DeSana and Marlon T. Riggs, 2022
 Jimmy DeSana: Submission, Edited with text by Drew Sawyer, preface by Anne Pasternak, and epilogue by Laurie Simmons, 2022

Collections 

 Institute of Contemporary Art, Boston, MA
 Metropolitan Museum of Art, New York
 Museum of Contemporary Art, Chicago, IL
 Museum of Fine Arts, Houston, TX
 Museum of Modern Art, New York, NY
 Whitney Museum of American Art, New York, NY

References

Further reading
 DeSana, Jimmy, Laurie Simmons, Roberta Smith, and William S. Bartman. Jimmy DeSana Los Angeles: A.R.T. Press, 1990. 
 Grundberg, Andy, Jerry Saltz, and Jimmy De Sana. Abstraction in Contemporary Photography. Richmond: Anderson Gallery, 1989.
 Hainley, Bruce. "Jimmy DeSana." Artforum International. 34(1995): 90–1.
Punk Art online version of catalogue for a 1978 exhibition at the Washington Project for the Arts, Washington DC.
 Watson, Liz. "Paying Homage to Jimmy DeSana." Lenny Letter. Hearst Digital Media, February 15, 2017. Web. February 28, 2017. – Includes link to video produced for amFAR made by artist and filmmaker Laurie Simmons with interview with her daughter, writer Lena Dunham.

1949 births
1990 deaths
AIDS-related deaths in New York (state)
20th-century American photographers
American gay artists
BDSM photographers
BDSM people